General elections were held in Saint Vincent and the Grenadines on 21 February 1994. The result was a victory for the New Democratic Party, which won twelve of the fifteen seats. Voter turnout was 65.6%.

Results

References

Saint Vincent
1994
1994 in Saint Vincent and the Grenadines
Election and referendum articles with incomplete results